Aziz Ahmed may refer to:

 Aziz Ahmed (civil servant), Pakistani civil servant
 Aziz Ahmed (general), Bangladeshi general